This is a list of known American football players who have played for the Newark Tornadoes of the National Football League. It includes players that have played in at least one game for the team.



A
Teddy Andrulewicz

B
Bob Beattie, 
Heinie Benkert,
George Bogue,
Nick Borelli, 
Pete Bove,
Phil Brennan,
Frank Briante

C
Stu Clancy,
Bill Connor, 
Sam Cordovano

D
Joe Davidson,
John Dibb

E
Bud Ellor

F
Bill Feaster,
Bernie Finn, 
Paul Frank

G
Les Grace

H
Ken Hauser

J
Bruce Jones

K
Tom Kerrigan,
Frank Kirkleski

L
John Law,
Tom Leary,
Paul Liston, 
Paul Longua

M
Tony Manfreda,
Hersh Martin, 
Jack McArthur, 
Felix McCormick,
Harry McGee, 
Ted Mitchell, 
Jim Mooney, 
Henry Myles

S
Andy Salata, 
Sam Sebo, 
Don Smith, 
Red Smith

T
Jimmy Tays, 
Johnny Tomaini

W
Ray Wagner, 
Carl Waite, 
Dutch Webber,
Erwin Woerner

References
1930 Newark Tornadoes Roster

 
Newark